The Church of St. Boniface is a former Roman Catholic parish church under the authority of the Roman Catholic Archdiocese of New York, located at 882 Second Avenue and 47th Street in Manhattan in New York City.  The parish was established in 1868 and suppressed in 1950. Its records are now housed at the Church of the Holy Family.

References 
Notes

Religious organizations established in 1868
Closed churches in the Roman Catholic Archdiocese of New York
Closed churches in New York City
Roman Catholic churches in Manhattan
Turtle Bay, Manhattan